De Nobili School CTPS, Bokaro, also known as De Nobili School, Chandrapura, is a private Catholic secondary school located in Bokaro, Chandrapura, in the state of Jharkhand, India. Founded and run by the Jesuits, the English-medium school includes nursery to grade XI. 

The school is named after a Christian missionary and Jesuit, Roberto de Nobili, who was the first foreigner to master Sanskrit, incognito, in sixteenth century Madurai. He apparently conducted himself like an orthodox Brahmin and is even said to have declared himself to be a descendant of Brahma.

Curriculum
De Nobili is an English medium school and Hindi language and culture have a place in the curriculum. Courses of study offered lead to the Indian Certificate of Secondary Education (ICSE) examinations in Class 10 and the Indian School Certificate (ISC) examinations in Class 12.

The school is one of 16 schools supported by Damodar Valley Corporation, an Indian state-owned corporation.

See also 

 List of Jesuit schools
 List of schools in Jharkhand
 Violence against Christians in India

References  

Jesuit secondary schools in India
Jesuit primary schools in India
Christian schools in Jharkhand
High schools and secondary schools in Jharkhand
Education in Bokaro Steel City